The Sociedad Cultural y Deportiva Independiente (popularly Inde) is a football club from Palma (Balearic Islands, Spain). It is located in Camp Redó neighborhood of the city, was founded in 1965 and is one of the oldest clubs in the capital.

The team plays in Primera Regional Mallorca of the Spanish football league, sixth level of Spanish football.

History 

The origins go back to the founding of Club Deportivo Nidda in 1965. Initially, the club adopted the name of its social premises: the Bar Nidda, located in the same neighborhood. In 1967 the club was re-established and adopted the current name.

Since its inception, the club played in regional categories in Mallorca and gradually moved up one category. The first years played alternately in Primera Regional (for not descending) or Segunda Regional. In the mid-1990s it took a qualitative leap and reached the Regional Preferente, also as a lift team between it and Primera Regional.

At the beginning of XXI century the club lived its best years. In 2008-09 season played the qualifying rounds for promotion to Tercera División and achieved promotion. But his journey in Tercera División (2009-10 season) was not good, and decreased that same season and returned to be a regular player in Regional Preferente. It drop to Primera regional for the 2015-16 season, largely due to the poor condition of its stadium. After a year promoted to Regional Preferente, where it was during two seasons and was relegated again to Primera Regional, where plays actually.

Stadium 

La Antoniana was inaugurated on 1 January 1935, with a capacity of 300 seats. The surface of the playing field is artificial grass and has a size of 98 x 65 meters. The team has played the matches since its inception.

This is the oldest football field in the city (inaugurated in 1935). For some years it was the only ground stadium in the city (and in poor condition), which influenced results of team and its lower categories.

After years of waiting, in May 2017 the renovation works for the installation of artificial grass were carried out. On 19 June of the same year the new facilities were inaugurated.

Season to season 

1 seasons in Tercera División
17 seasons in Reg. Pref.
30 seasons in 1ª Reg
7 seasons in 2ª Reg
1 seasons in 3ª Reg

Honours 

 Primera Regional
 Winners (2): 2006-07, 2015-16
 Runners-up (2): 1997-98, 2001-02

Women's team 

The club has a women's section. This was set up in 1999-2000 season and has since competed without interruption, becoming one of most veteran clubs in competition in Balearic Islands.

References

External links 
 
 
 

Football clubs in the Balearic Islands
Association football clubs established in 1965
Sport in Palma de Mallorca
1965 establishments in Spain